The cartoon character, Casper the Friendly Ghost who appears in numerous cartoon shorts as well as Harvey Comics publication, has appeared in five films since his inception, most of which were either released in television or straight-to-video while only one was released theatrically. Many for the most part are unrelated to each other. Like in the comics and animated shorts, the films feature Casper, a ghost of a deceased child, who refused to frighten others and would like nothing more than to be friendly around the world; however, due to the nature of what he appears to be, it would often get him shunned and petrified by whoever he encounters, but along the way, he would find and befriend a certain someone he could identify himself with, and would often help that someone in need.

Created by Seymour Reit and Joe Oriolo, the character made his debut in three theatrical animated shorts in the mid to late 1940s from Noveltoons, and were released by Paramount Pictures and produced by Paramount Pictures' Famous Studios, then started a series of theatrical shorts from 1950 to 1959, right before Harvey Comics ended up buying the rights to the character.

After having numerous Casper cartoons released on home video by Universal Studios, a deal was made for a live-action feature produced by Amblin Entertainment with executive producer Steven Spielberg hiring Brad Silberling in his directional debut to direct Casper (1995). The film became a commercial success but was met with mixed reviews from critics. In the late 1990s, The Harvey Entertainment Company and Saban Entertainment brought the Casper movie rights and produced two direct-to-video films released by 20th Century Fox Home Entertainment with Casper: A Spirited Beginning (1997) and its sequel, Casper Meets Wendy (1998). Both films are highly regarded as prequels to the 1995 film, but completely contradicted everything that was presented in the theatrical film and doesn't appear to be in the same continuity. The films were also critically panned by critics, which led Universal Studios to cancel further plans for a sequel to the theatrical film.

In the early 2000s, Harvey Entertainment returned once more along with Mainframe Entertainment (replacing Saban Entertainment) with a film released by Universal Pictures Home Entertainment entitled Casper's Haunted Christmas (2000). Unlike the previous three films, this was completely done in computer animation. This was also the last Casper film to be involved with Universal. In the mid-2000s, was the second computer-animated film made for television produced by Moonscoop and released by Classic Media titled Casper's Scare School (2006). The film eventually had its own spin-off series with the same title airing in Cartoon Network, released in 2009.

Films

Early Animated short films

Paramount cartoon shorts

Paramount Pictures' Famous Studios had produced three theatrical shorts featuring Casper the Friendly Ghost from the Noveltoon series with The Friendly Ghost in 1945, There's Good Boos To-Night in 1948 and A Haunting We Will Go in 1949. Paramount would later produce a series of theatricals shorts of Casper the Friendly Ghost from 1950 to 1959.

Theatrical film

Casper (1995)

With Steven Spielberg as executive producer of the film, he hired Brad Silberling to direct, making it Brad's first feature film as a director. The film stars Christina Ricci, Bill Pullman, Cathy Moriarty and Eric Idle, with voice talents of  Joe Nipote, Joe Alaskey, Brad Garrett and Malachi Pearson in the title role. This film was set in Friendship, Maine and makes extensive use of computer-generated imagery to make the ghosts such as Casper and his uncles the Ghostly Trio come to life and have them interacted with the live actors. This was also the first film to feature a CGI character in a lead role. The film gave Casper a back-story and is the only time that explains his death. In the film, Casper was a twelve-year-old boy living in Whipstaff Manor with his inventor father J.T. McFadden until he died from pneumonia after playing out in the cold until it was past nightfall. This was also the only film to have Casper on screen in his human form. The film received mixed reviews from critics, with a rating of 51%, based on 41 reviews on review aggregator Rotten Tomatoes. The film opened at #1 over the Memorial Day weekend, grossing $16,840,385 over its first three days from 2,714 theaters, averaging $6,205 per theater. Over four days it grossed $22,091,975, averaging $8,140 per theater. It stayed at #1 in its second weekend, grossing another $13,409,610, and boosting its 10-day cume to $38,921,225.

Cancelled sequel
Following the release of Casper, Simon Wells co-wrote a screenplay for Casper 2, in which he was set to direct. However, in July 2000, it was reported that Universal Pictures had cancelled the sequel due to the disappointing sales from the direct-to-video Casper films and the hesitation of Christina Ricci.

Saban Entertainment Direct-to-Video films (1997–1998)

Casper: A Spirited Beginning (1997)

In 1997, The Harvey Entertainment Company and Saban Entertainment produced the direct-to-video film released by 20th Century Fox Home Entertainment. The film was directed as a prequel to the 1995 film explaining how Casper became a ghost, but completely ignoring the storyline of 1995 film, with Casper dying on the present day, no mention of Whipstaff Manor or his father J.T. McFadden and the Ghostly Trio not being directly related to him. While it being a direct-to-video film, the film has a list of an all-star cast, such as Steve Guttenberg, Lori Loughlin, Rodney Dangerfield, Michael McKean, James Earl Jones, and Pauly Shore. The film was panned by critics; based on 5 reviews on review aggregator Rotten Tomatoes, 0% of critics gave the film a positive review, with an average rating of 2.2/10

Casper Meets Wendy (1998)

After the release of Casper: A Spirited Beginning, in 1998, Saban Entertainment returned once more with its sequel while being the second prequel to the 1995 feature film Casper. The film's director Sean McNamara, who also directed Casper: A Spirited Beginning, reintroduced a character who was in the Casper comics and cartoon known as Wendy the Good Little Witch. The role of Wendy was given to Hilary Duff in her first feature when she was 11 years old. The film also marks the second Casper film to co-star Cathy Moriarty, who played the villainess in the 1995 film. The film received mostly negative reviews from critics. Based on 6 reviews on review aggregator Rotten Tomatoes with 17% giving the film a positive review and an average score of 4.05/10, it proved to be a slight improvement over Casper: A Spirited Beginning, but still had low reception when compared to the 1995 theatrical film. The film also won the Children's Programming – Electronic Visual Effects award with Hilary Duff being nominated for a Young Artist Award.

Animated films

Direct-to-video film

Casper's Haunted Christmas (2000)

In 2000, The Harvey Entertainment Company returned once with Mainframe Entertainment to produce a film released by Universal Pictures Home Entertainment. The film was all done in computer animation, as opposed to its live-action predecessors. The film was set in Christmas time with Casper and his uncles; the Ghostly Trio being forced by Kibosh to have Casper purposely scare someone on Christmas Eve or else he and his uncles will be sentenced to The Dark for all eternity. The film also features Casper's cousin's Spooky the Tuff Little Ghost and Spooky's girlfriend Poil. Brendan Ryan Barrett who portrayed Casper's best friend, Chris Carson from Casper: A Spirited Beginning got to voice the titular character himself in the film.

Television film

Casper's Scare School (2006)

In 2006, Moonscoop produced a made for television animated film released by Classic Media. The film which features Casper being sentenced to a school that will teach him how to scare others. In 2009, the film eventually had a spin-off animated series with the same title airing in Cartoon Network.

Future
With Universal Pictures now owning the rights to Casper (with the exceptions of Casper Meets Wendy (owned by Disney through 20th Century Studios Home Entertainment), and cartoons Casper and the Angels, Casper's Halloween Special, and Casper's First Christmas (latter three owned by Warner Bros. Animation through its former Hanna-Barbera Productions division)), there are plans to reboot the character in live-action again and have him return to the big screen as Steven Spielberg had mentioned that Casper will not return in the small screen like the last four movies. In 2012, DreamWorks Animation acquired the rights to the character from Classic Media as well as all the other Harvey Comics characters. Later in 2016, NBCUniversal bought DWA, so Universal's involvement with the Casper series could continue either with DreamWorks Animation or Illumination Entertainment rebooting the series.

Cast and characters

Ben Stein has made a cameo appearance in all three of the live-action films. In Casper he portrayed a lawyer to the late father of the film's antagonist Carrigan Crittenden presenting the will her father gave her to Whipstaff. In Casper: A Spirited Beginning he portrayed a Grocer whom Casper innocently approached causing him to run in fear. In Casper Meets Wendy he portrayed a guest at the dance party where there was a scene with him talking to the human whom Fatso processed, and another scene where he asked one of the witches in disguised: Gert (another character portrayed by Moriarty) for a dance, but she scold him. While not being credited in the film, rumors have stated that he is a lawyer which could mean that he is the same character from the original film, but it is unclear.

Casper Van Dien has made two cameo appearances in the Saban-produced prequels. In Casper: A Spirited Beginning he portrayed as one of the bystanders in defending the Applegate Mansion. In Casper Meets Wendy he portrayed as a hunk at the dance party the three witches fall heads over heels for causing him to flee leaving only his leather jacket behind.

The first two films have had other celebrity cameos. In Casper, there was Don Novello reprising his role as Father Guido Sarducci from Saturday Night Live as well as Dan Aykroyd reprising his role as Ghostbuster Raymond "Ray" Stantz. Clint Eastwood, Rodney Dangerfield, Mel Gibson and the Crypt Keeper all appeared in Dr. James Harvey's reflection. Steven Spielberg was also supposed to appear in the reflection, but was cut out. In Casper: A Spirited Beginning, there was Brian Doyle-Murray portraying the head construction worker: Foreman Dave who was one of the witnesses petrified of the Ghostly Trio, Debi Mazar (who was uncredited in the film) portraying Tim Carson's secretary assistant Angie, and Sherman Hemsley portraying a store owner who was unintentionally saved by Casper when he was being robbed.

Reception

Box office performance

Critical and public response

See also
 List of ghost films
 Casper the Friendly Ghost filmography

References

Film series introduced in 1995

Casper the Friendly Ghost
American film series
20th Century Studios franchises
Universal Pictures franchises